William Swinburne may refer to:
William Swinburne (locomotive builder) (1805–1883), American builder of steam locomotives
Sir William Swinburne (died 1404), English member of parliament for Northumberland in 1395
William Swinburne (Essex MP) (died 1422), English member of parliament for Essex in 1414

William T. Swinburne (1847–1928), United States Navy admiral